The following is a list of naturalized basketball players who have represented their naturalized country at a FIBA international tournament. The list includes players both past and present after they have represented their new nation at least once. These list excludes players whose citizenship status is unrecognized by FIBA and therefore treated the same was as naturalized players as per FIBA eligibility rules; such as the status of American-born player Jordan Clarkson who is born to a Filipino mother and has Filipino citizenship at birth.

Female players (By country)
Note: This list is working documentation as of 13 July 2019.

Male players (By country)

FIBA Africa

FIBA Americas

FIBA Asia

FIBA Europe

FIBA Oceania

See also

 FIBA eligibility rules
 List of sportspeople who competed for more than one nation
 List of foreign NBA players
 List of foreign WNBA players
 List of foreign WNBL players

References

Change of nationality in sport
Lists of women's basketball players
Lists of basketball players
Employment of foreign-born